Richard Hastings Ellis (July 19, 1919March 28, 1989) was a United States Air Force  general who served as the commander in chief of the Strategic Air Command and director of the Joint Strategic Target Planning Staff with headquarters at Offutt Air Force Base, Nebraska. He was also director of the Joint Strategic Connectivity Staff.

Biography
Born and raised in Laurel, Delaware, Ellis attended Dickinson College in Carlisle, Pennsylvania. He received his Bachelor of Arts degree in history from in 1941 and juris doctor degree from its School of Law in 1949. Ellis was awarded an honorary Doctor of Science degree from Dickinson College in 1961; honorary Doctor of Laws degrees from Dickinson School of Law in 1974, the University of Akron in 1979, and the University of Nebraska, Omaha, in 1981.

Ellis entered active military duty in September 1941 as an aviation cadet at Maxwell Field, Alabama. He received his commission and pilot wings at Turner Field, Georgia, in April 1942.

During World War II, Ellis served with the 3rd Bombardment Group in Australia, New Guinea, and the Philippines, and flew more than 200 combat missions in the Western Pacific area. He served as a pilot, commander of the 90th Bombardment Squadron, group operations officer and, from September 1944, as group commander. In April 1945, Ellis was assigned as deputy chief of staff, United States Far East Air Forces, in the Philippine Islands and Japan.

He requested release from active duty, became a member of the Air Force Reserve and entered Dickinson School of Law in 1946. He graduated in 1949 and, after admission to the bar in Delaware, practiced law in Wilmington. Recalled to active duty in October 1950, he was assigned to Headquarters Tactical Air Command, Langley AFB, Virginia; then as deputy for operations, 49th Air Division, Sculthorpe, England; and later as chief, Air Plans and Operations Section, Supreme Headquarters Allied Powers Europe.

From January 1956 to May 1958, Ellis was deputy chief of staff, operations, Headquarters Nineteenth Air Force, Foster AFB, Texas. He was then assigned to the Directorate of Plans, Headquarters U.S. Air Force, Washington, D.C., first as chief, Weapons Plans Branch, then as assistant director of plans for war plans, and later as assistant director of plans, joint matters.

In July 1961, Ellis become executive to the chief of staff, U.S. Air Force. From August 1963 to June 1965, he commanded the 315th Air Division, Tachikawa Air Base, Japan. He returned to Washington, D.C., and served as deputy director, J-5 (Plans and Policy), with the Joint Staff. In August 1967 he returned to the Air Staff, this time as director of plans. He assumed command of 9th Air Force with headquarters at Shaw AFB, South Carolina, in September 1969.

Ellis was appointed vice commander in chief of U.S. Air Forces in Europe in September 1970, became commander, 6th Allied Tactical Air Force, with headquarters at Izmir, Turkey, in April 1971; and commander of Allied Air Forces, Southern Europe, with headquarters at Naples, Italy, in June 1972. He assumed additional duty as commander, Sixteenth Air Force, Torrejon Air Base, Spain, in May 1973.

He served as Vice Chief of Staff, U.S. Air Force, from November 1973 to August 1975. He was then appointed commander, Allied Air Forces Central Europe, and commander in chief, U.S. Air Forces in Europe. He assumed command of SAC in August 1977.

Ellis was a command pilot and earned the Master Missile and the Parachutist badges. He has been awarded the Distinguished Service Cross, Air Force Distinguished Service Medal with three oak leaf clusters, Silver Star, Legion of Merit with two oak leaf clusters, Distinguished Flying Cross, Air Medal with four oak leaf clusters, Purple Heart and Grand Officer of the Italian Republic. He was awarded the State of Delaware Distinguished Service Medal by Governor Walter W. Bacon in 1946. In September 1980, he was presented the Air Force Association's highest honor, the H.H. Arnold Award for significant contributions to national defense. As the recipient of this award he was also named as the association's National Aerospace Man of the Year. General Ellis received the Korean Order of National Security Merit, First Class (Tong Il Jang) on May 13, 1981, at the Korean Ministry of National Defense in Seoul. This award, the highest honor given by the Republic of Korea to a foreign military leader, was presented to the general for his important contributions to national defense of the Republic of Korea.

Ellis was promoted to general in 1973 on November 1 (with date of rank September 30), and retired from active duty at age 62 on August 1, 1981.

General Ellis died in 1989 at age 69, and was buried at Arlington National Cemetery.

See also
 List of commanders of USAFE

References

External links

 New York Times obituary
 USAF biography
 

United States Air Force generals
Recipients of the Legion of Merit
Recipients of the Distinguished Flying Cross (United States)
Recipients of the Air Force Distinguished Service Medal
Recipients of the Distinguished Service Cross (United States)
Order of National Security Merit members
Burials at Arlington National Cemetery
Dickinson College alumni
People from Laurel, Delaware
1919 births
1989 deaths
United States Army Air Forces pilots of World War II
United States Army Air Forces generals
Recipients of the Air Medal
Recipients of the Silver Star
Recipients of the Order of the Sword (United States)
Vice Chiefs of Staff of the United States Air Force